King Rezin of Aram or Rasin of Syria in DRB (*Raḍyan) ruled from Damascus during the 8th century BC. During his reign, he was a tributary of King Tiglath-Pileser III of Assyria.

Biography
Rezin conspired with a number of Levantine kings (e.g., Hiram II of Tyre) to rebel against Tiglath-Pileser III. Rezin's reign ended in 732 BC, when Tiglath-Pileser III sacked Damascus and annexed Aram:

In order to save his life, he (Raḫiānu) fled alone and entered the gate of his city [like] a mongoose. I [im]paled his foremost men alive while making (the people of) his land watch. For forty-five days I set up my camp [aro]und his city and confined him (there) like a bird in a cage. I cut down his plantations, [...] ..., (and) orchards, which were without number; I did not leave a single one (standing).
I surrounded (and) captured [the city ...]ḫādara, the ancestral home of Raḫiānu (Rezin) of the land Damascus, [the pl]ace where he was born.
I carried off 800 people, with their possessions, their oxen, (and) their sheep and goats. I carried off 750 captives from the cities Kuruṣṣâ (and) Samāya, (as well as) 550 captives from the city Metuna. Like tell(s) after the Deluge, I destroyed 591 cities of 16 districts of the land Damascus. (RINAP 1, Tiglath-Pileser III 20, l. 8’-17’)

Assyrian inscriptions indicate that Tiglath-pileser made a three year campaign in the Levant from 734-732 BC. In the first year he attacked the Phoenicians and sacked the coastal cities of Tyre and Sidon. In the second year he devastated the land of Aram and the Arabs living in the Trans-Jordan under Queen Shamsi. Although he beat the Arameans in the field, he failed to take Damascus. In the third year he managed to take Damascus, where he slew King Rezin. He also destroyed and leveled the villages in Northern Israel. He boasted of slaying King Pekah, and he installed Hoshea on the throne. Only the fortified capital of Samaria remained, and the entire land was brought low. Archaeology confirms that many cities destroyed during this time period were never rebuilt.

According to the Bible (2 Kings 16), the sack of Damascus was instigated by King Ahaz of Judah and ended in Rezin's execution. The execution of Rezin is neither confirmed nor disconfirmed by independent evidence.

According to 2 Kings Rezin allied with Pekah, son of Remaliah, against Ahaz. The defeat of both kings is promised to Ahaz in the Immanuel prophecy Isaiah 7:14, linked to the birth of a child who will be an infant, possibly Ahaz' royal heir Hezekiah, when this takes place.

See also

List of biblical figures identified in extra-biblical sources
List of Syrian monarchs
Timeline of Syrian history
Syro-Ephraimite War

References

External links

8th-century BC Kings of Syria
Aramean kings
Monarchs of the Hebrew Bible
Kings of Syria
House of Pekah